Nemastoma may refer to:
 Nemastoma (harvestman), a genus of harvestmen in the family Nemastomatidae
 Nemastoma (alga), a genus of red algae in the family Nemastomataceae